The LSU Football Operations Center, built in 2006, is an all-in-one facility that includes the Tigers locker room, players' lounge, Peterson-Roberts weight room, training room, equipment room, video operations center and coaches offices. The video operations center has editing equipment to review practice and game footage along with producing videos for the team.

The building holds individual position meeting rooms and the Shirley and Bill Lawton Team Room, including 144 theatre-style seats for team meetings and audiovisual facilities for meetings, lectures and reviewing game footage.

In December 2014, LSU Athletic Director Joe Alleva announced the LSU Football Operations Center will be renovated. The weight room, training room and coaches' meeting rooms will be expanded, and the locker room, player's lounge and position meeting rooms will be completely renovated.

The LSU Tigers baseball team, LSU Tigers women's soccer team and LSU Tigers women's volleyball team use the weight room.

Gallery

See also
 Charles McClendon Practice Facility
 LSU Indoor Practice Facility
 LSU Tigers football
 Tiger Stadium (LSU)
 LSU Tigers and Lady Tigers

References

External links
 LSU Football Operations Center at the Charles McClendon Practice Facility

American football venues in Baton Rouge, Louisiana
College football venues
LSU Tigers baseball venues
LSU Tigers football venues
LSU Tigers women's soccer venues
LSU Tigers women's volleyball venues
Sports venues completed in 2006
2006 establishments in Louisiana